Venus Glacier is a glacier on the east coast of Alexander Island, Antarctica, 10 nautical miles (18 km) long and 6 nautical miles (11 km) wide at its mouth flowing east into George VI Sound lying between Keystone Cliffs and Triton Point. The coast in this vicinity was first seen from the air by Lincoln Ellsworth on November 23, 1935 and roughly mapped from photos obtained on that flight by W.L.G. Joerg. The glacier was first surveyed in 1949 by the Falkland Islands Dependencies Survey and named by the United Kingdom Antarctic Place-Names Committee for the planet Venus, the second planet of the Solar System.

See also 
 List of glaciers in the Antarctic
 Jupiter Glacier
 Pluto Glacier
 Uranus Glacier

Further reading 
 J.L. SMELLIE, Lithostratigraphy of Miocene-Recent, alkaline volcanic fields in the Antarctic Peninsula and eastern Ellsworth Land, Antarctic Science 71 (3): 362-378 (1999)

External links 

 Venus Glacier on USGS website
 Venus Glacier on SCAR website
 Venus Glacier area map

References 

Glaciers of Alexander Island